The Taehŭng concentration camp is a North Korean prison camp for political dissidents and those who have committed economic crimes. It is located in the Kŏmdŏk district (chigu) of Tanch'ŏn-si, South Hamgyong province in eastern North Korea. It has been reported that a number of North Korean nationals who have traveled to sporting events abroad have, on their return, been imprisoned for speaking about their experiences in other countries, particularly South Korea.

See also
Human rights in North Korea
Politics of North Korea

References

South Hamgyong
Concentration camps in North Korea